Tbilisi Theological Seminary is a spiritual training institution, which operated from 1817 to 1919 in the Georgian Exarchate of the Russian Orthodox Church. When Joseph Stalin  was fourteen in 1894, he received a scholarship. The language of instruction was Russian, and the Georgian language was disparaged by the Russian priests who taught there. Stalin was a voracious reader in both languages. He turned into a cultural nationalist for Georgia. He participated in student politics and anonymously published poetry in Georgian in the local newspaper. Although his performance had been good, he was expelled in 1899 after missing his final exams.

In 1993 it reopened as a higher educational institution of the Georgian Orthodox Church.

References

Bibliography

 
 

1993 establishments in Georgia (country)
Buildings and structures in Tbilisi
Christianity in Tbilisi
Eastern Orthodox seminaries
Educational institutions of the Russian Orthodox Church
Education in Tbilisi
Georgian Orthodox Church
Education in the Russian Empire
1817 establishments in the Russian Empire